Archil Arveladze (born 22 February 1973) is a Georgian former professional footballer who played as a striker for various sides in Europe.

Club career
Born in Tbilisi, Arveladze spent his youth career with local team Iberia Tbilisi. The striker began his senior career at Georgian champion team, Dinamo Tbilisi. Playing abroad in Turkey, the Netherlands and Germany, he returned to Georgia in 2003.

International career
Arveladze earned 32 caps for the Georgia national team, scoring six goals.

Personal life
His brother Revaz also played for 1. FC Köln at one point. Archil's twin brother Shota retired from football in 2008.

On 21 July 2021, it was announced that Arveladze would possibly be a candidate for Tbilisi mayor with the For Georgia party in the 2021 Georgian local elections.

Honours
Trabzonspor
Turkish Super Cup: 1995

References

1973 births
Living people
Association football forwards
Footballers from Georgia (country)
FC Dinamo Tbilisi players
Trabzonspor footballers
NAC Breda players
1. FC Köln players
Süper Lig players
Eredivisie players
Bundesliga players
Georgia (country) international footballers
Expatriate footballers from Georgia (country)
Expatriate sportspeople from Georgia (country) in Turkey
Expatriate footballers in Turkey
Expatriate sportspeople from Georgia (country) in the Netherlands
Expatriate footballers in the Netherlands
Expatriate sportspeople from Georgia (country) in Germany
Expatriate footballers in Germany
Identical twins
Twin sportspeople
Twins from Georgia (country)
Footballers from Tbilisi